Yeli Bolagh (also Romanized as Yelī Bolāgh) is a village in Ajorluy-ye Gharbi Rural District, Baruq District, Miandoab County, West Azerbaijan Province, Iran. At the 2006 census, its population was 19, in 4 families.

References 

Populated places in Miandoab County